Burnett Field, in Dallas, Texas, was home to several minor league baseball clubs from 1924 to 1964. The ballpark sat 10,500 fans. It was located at 1500 East Jefferson Boulevard (west, first base), Brazos Street (north, third base); Colorado Boulevard (south, right field); and the Trinity River (east, left field).

The ballpark began as Gardner Park, or as some historians call it, "Gardner Park II". The original Gardner Park ("I") had opened in 1915, at Jefferson Boulevard and Comal Street. This park, in turn, had replaced Gaston Park, built in the 1880s at Second Avenue and Parry Avenue, currently the site of the Texas State Fairgrounds Music Hall.

The original Gardner Park burned on July 19, 1924, following a game. The owners went to work right away and built a new Gardner Park, across the street from the old one, that would serve the club for the next 40 years. The club also played a home game on the fairgrounds once, when they staged their opening day game for 1950 at the Cotton Bowl, drawing over 50,000 fans before resuming play at their normal grounds.

At various times, Dallas' minor league team was known as the Giants, Steers, Rebels, Eagles, and Rangers. The park itself was also renamed Steers Park, Rebels Park, and Eagles Stadium at various times. Burnett Field was its temporary name in 1948, and became permanent in 1951, named for Rangers owner Dick Burnett.

The club played in the Texas League starting in 1888, continuing until they joined the American Association in 1959, a year after they had been renamed as the Dallas Rangers.

In 1960 the club merged with Fort Worth and became the Dallas-Fort Worth Rangers, playing half their home games at LaGrave Field in Fort Worth, Texas. The Rangers played in the Association through 1962, then had two seasons in the Pacific Coast League in 1963 and 1964 before moving to Vancouver, British Columbia.

The Dallas Cowboys used Burnett Field as their primary practice facility when the team was founded in 1960. The defense met in the clubhouse on the third-base side of the field while the offense met in the first-base clubhouse.

1964 was the end of professional baseball at Burnett Field. When the Texas League revived the franchise in 1965, as the Dallas-Fort Worth Spurs, both LaGrave and Burnett Fields were replaced by Turnpike Stadium, later called Arlington Stadium, midway between Dallas and Fort Worth in Arlington, Texas.

Google Maps shows the former ballpark lot as being currently a grass-filled vacant lot.

References

Sources

External links
Dallas-Fort Worth Minor-League Baseball at The Handbook of Texas
Sanborn map showing Gardner Park I in 1922
Sanborn map showing Burnett Field by 1950

Minor league baseball venues
Defunct baseball venues in the United States
Sports venues in Dallas
Baseball venues in the Dallas–Fort Worth metroplex
Defunct minor league baseball venues
Baseball venues in Texas
Defunct sports venues in Texas